Aleksandar Radović (Cyrillic: Александар Радовић; born 30 March 1987) is a Montenegrin footballer who plays as a defender for Drina Zvornik.

Club career
Radović started playing football in Red Star Belgrade where he spent 10 years in youth squads and in 2007 was elected the best youth player. During that period he was loaned to Serbian Second League clubs FK Kolubara and FK Hajduk Beograd, and to Macedonian First League club FK Vardar.

In 2007, Radović signed a contract for FK Budućnost Podgorica where he stayed for two and a half seasons and played more than 20 matches.

In summer 2010, he moved to KF Elbasani where he played 9 matches in Albanian Superliga and 5 matches in Albanian Cup. During the winter break he was loaned to Macedonian First League club FK Rabotnički where he played the rest of the season.

In summer 2011 he returned to Serbia and signed with SuperLiga club FK BSK Borča.

After FK BSK Borča Radović moved to Gaz Metan Mediaș and played 9 matches. On August 7, 2013, he was presented as a new player of Tiraspol.

International career
Internationally he played Montenegro national under-21 football team.

Honours
Budućnost
Montenegrin First League: 2007–08

References

1987 births
Living people
Sportspeople from Pančevo
Association football defenders
Serbia and Montenegro footballers
Montenegrin footballers
Montenegro under-21 international footballers
Red Star Belgrade footballers
FK Kolubara players
OFK Bečej 1918 players
FK Vardar players
FK Hajduk Beograd players
FK Budućnost Podgorica players
KF Elbasani players
FK Rabotnički players
FK BSK Borča players
FK Dinamo Pančevo players
CS Gaz Metan Mediaș players
FC Tiraspol players
FC Politehnica Iași (2010) players
FC Olt Slatina players
FK Drina Zvornik players
FK Šumadija Aranđelovac players
FK Smederevo players
First League of Serbia and Montenegro players
Macedonian First Football League players
Kategoria Superiore players
Serbian First League players
Serbian SuperLiga players
Liga I players
Liga II players
Moldovan Super Liga players
Premier League of Bosnia and Herzegovina players
First League of the Republika Srpska players
Montenegrin expatriate footballers
Expatriate footballers in North Macedonia
Montenegrin expatriate sportspeople in North Macedonia
Expatriate footballers in Albania
Montenegrin expatriate sportspeople in Albania
Expatriate footballers in Romania
Montenegrin expatriate sportspeople in Romania
Expatriate footballers in Moldova
Montenegrin expatriate sportspeople in Moldova
Expatriate footballers in Bosnia and Herzegovina
Montenegrin expatriate sportspeople in Bosnia and Herzegovina